Uttara Group may refer to

Uttara Group of Companies, holding company of Uttara Motors Limited
Uttara Group of Industries, trading company founded by Giridhari Lal Modi, a Marwari businessman